Clifford Brooks, Jr. (born June 21, 1949 in Pineland, Texas) is a former American Football defensive back in the National Football League for the Cleveland Browns, the Philadelphia Eagles, the Buffalo Bills, and the New York Jets.  He played college football at Tennessee State University and was drafted in the second round of the 1972 NFL Draft.

Earned a Bachelor of Science in Business Administration in 1972.

Vice-President/Commercial Lending for First City National Bank, Houston, TX for thirteen years.

Started Brooks Associates, a business management company in 1990 to the present.

In 2000 became part owner of an ambulance company.  Assumed 100% ownership in 2002.  Sold the company in 2007.

In 2008, incorporated and became part owner of a crane servicing company, providing inspections, repairs, parts, and training for companies operating on-shore and off-shore hydraulic pedestal cranes in the oil and gas exploration industry.

References

1949 births
Living people
American football defensive backs
Players of American football from Texas
People from Pineland, Texas
Tennessee State Tigers football players
Cleveland Browns players
Philadelphia Eagles players
Buffalo Bills players
New York Jets players